Sine Totoo (The Best of Serbisyong Totoo) is a Philippine television documentary show broadcast by GMA Network. Showcasing documentaries previously produced by the network, it premiered on February 17, 2007. The show concluded on February 28, 2009 with a total of 102 episodes.

Shows featured
 I-Witness
 Pinoy Abroad
 Out!
 Reporter's Notebook
 Jessica Soho Reports
 Imbestigador
 Wish Ko Lang!
 Emergency
 100% Pinoy!
 Pinoy Meets World
 Born to Be Wild
 Philippine Agenda
 Brigada Siete
 Extra Challenge
 Kapuso Mo, Jessica Soho
 At Your Service
 Kay Susan Tayo!

Ratings
According to AGB Nielsen Philippines' Mega Manila household television ratings, the final episode of Sine Totoo scored a 9.5% rating.

References

2007 Philippine television series debuts
2009 Philippine television series endings
Filipino-language television shows
GMA Network original programming
GMA Integrated News and Public Affairs shows
Philippine documentary television series